Roberto Óscar Albuquerque (born November 4, 1993) is an American soccer player who plays as a defender and currently plays for Rio Grande Valley FC in the USL Championship.

Career

Youth
Albuquerque played club soccer with Chicago Magic PSG between 2009 and 2012. He also played high school soccer at Crystal Lake South High School.

College
In 2012, Albuquerque attended the University of Missouri–Kansas City to play college soccer. With the Roos, Albuquerque made 63 appearances and scored 4 goals over four seasons.

Professional
Albuquerque started his professional career in 2018 in Spain, playing with fourth-tier Tercera División side Lealtad. He then spent a season with Mensajero, before moving to third-tier side Real Avilés. On June 19, 2021, Albuquerque returned to the United States, joining USL Championship side Rio Grande Valley FC. He made his debut the same day, starting against San Antonio FC.

References

External links
 Profile at UMKC

1993 births
Living people
American soccer players
Association football defenders
Soccer players from Chicago
People from Chicago
Kansas City Roos men's soccer players
CD Lealtad players
CD Mensajero players
Real Avilés CF footballers
Rio Grande Valley FC Toros players
Tercera División players
USL Championship players